Yelena Pavlovna Zhukova (5 June 1906, Saint Petersburg – 31 October 1991, Leningrad) was a Soviet and Russian painter, a member of the Leningrad Union of Artists, who lived and worked in Leningrad. She was regarded as one of representatives of the Leningrad School of Painting, most famous for her landscape paintings and portraits of various Russian artists such as Kuzma Petrov-Vodkin (early 1930s), Yaroslav Nikolaev (1945) and Mikhail Nesterov (1936).

See also
 Fine Art of Leningrad
 Leningrad School of Painting
 List of 20th-century Russian painters
 List of painters of Saint Petersburg Union of Artists
 Saint Petersburg Union of Artists

References

Sources 
 Выставка произведений ленинградских художников 1961 года. Каталог. Л., Художник РСФСР, 1964. С.18.
 Художники народов СССР. Биобиблиографический словарь. Т.4. Кн.1. М., Искусство, 1983. С.145.
 Справочник членов Ленинградской организации Союза художников РСФСР. Л., Художник РСФСР, 1987. С.45.

1906 births
1991 deaths
20th-century Russian painters
Painters from Saint Petersburg
People from Sankt-Peterburgsky Uyezd
Members of the Leningrad Union of Artists
Saint Peter's School (Saint Petersburg) alumni
Recipients of the Order of the Red Banner of Labour
Leningrad School artists
Socialist realist artists
Russian landscape painters
Russian realist painters
Russian women artists
Russian women painters
Soviet realist painters
Soviet women artists